Orange Juice is a 2010 Russian comedy-drama film directed by Andrey Proshkin.

Plot 
The film takes place in a summer cottage in the Moscow Region, in which three people live: the American millionaire Stephen, the young doctor Egor and the nurse Stephen, whose life turns into a real nightmare. Despite her strength and independent nature, she is forced to do what he asks, because she needs money, as a result of which many funny situations occur with them.

Cast 
 Ingeborga Dapkunaite
 Mikhail Kozakov
 Lada Maris
 Andrey Panin	
 Aleksandra Skachkova
 Olga Yakovleva	
 Aleksandr Yatsenko

References

External links 
 

2010 films
2010s Russian-language films
Russian comedy-drama films
2010 comedy-drama films